Gianluca Signorini (17 March 1960 – 6 November 2002) was an Italian footballer, who played as a defender. He made more than 200 appearances for Genoa C.F.C.

Career
Born in Pisa, Signorini started his career playing for his home team, Pisa S.C. of Serie C1, and successively for Pietrasanta, Prato, Livorno, Ternana and Cavese before joining A.C. Parma, with Arrigo Sacchi as coach. He quickly became a key player for Parma, helping the club to Serie B promotion in 1986, winning the Serie C1 title. He was successively signed by Nils Liedholm's A.S. Roma, and then to Genoa in 1988, after personal requests by coach Francesco Scoglio; during his first season with the club, he immediately helped the team to Serie A promotion by winning the 1988–89 Serie B title. In total, he played seven seasons for Genoa, all seven years as team captain; a hard defender and a fan favourite, he is remembered as one of the last (and best) Italian sweepers. In his later years at the club, he was a vital member of the Genoese "dream team" which managed to reach the semi-finals of the 1991–92 UEFA Cup, and became the first Italian team to beat Liverpool F.C. on their Anfield Road home turf; he also helped the team to a fourth-place finish during the 1990–91 Serie A season, the club's best league finish since the end of the Second World War.

He left Genoa in 1995, aged 35, to join his hometown club Pisa, then in Serie D, and retired two years later. He played 210 Serie A matches with 6 goals.

Retirement and illness
After having ended his playing career, Signorini started a managing career working for Pisa, and serving as joint caretaker manager during their 1997–98 Serie C2 campaign, However, he soon discovered he was suffering from amyotrophic lateral sclerosis, also known as Lou Gehrig's disease, an illness that slowly forced immobility, paralyzing all his muscles. He died on 6 November 2002, in his Pisa home. In his honour, the #6 jersey, worn by Signorini during his time for the rossoblu club, was retired.

Style of play
A large, tough, elegant, and physically strong player, Signorini is regarded as one of Italy's best and last true sweepers; his talent, technical ability, and tactical intelligence as a central defender had a strong influence on Franco Baresi's playing style.

Personal life
Signorini was married to Antonella; together they had four children. On 17 May 2009, one of Signorini's sons, Andrea, a footballer himself, made his Serie A debut with Genoa, thus continuing the legacy of his father and former rossoblu captain.

Honours

Club
Parma
Serie C1: 1985–86

Genoa
Serie B: 1988–89

See also
Stefano Borgonovo
Giovanni Bertini
Pietro Anastasi

References

External links
Addio a Signorini (from RAI Sport) 
Career profile of Gianluca Signorini

1960 births
2002 deaths
Sportspeople from Pisa
Footballers from Tuscany
Italian footballers
Pisa S.C. players
Ternana Calcio players
U.S. Livorno 1915 players
Parma Calcio 1913 players
A.S. Roma players
Genoa C.F.C. players
Cavese 1919 players
Serie A players
Serie B players
Neurological disease deaths in Tuscany
Deaths from motor neuron disease
Association football sweepers
Association football central defenders